Ravisubramaniyan (ரவிசுப்பிரமணியன்)  is a writer, poet and documentary film maker.

Life
Hailing from Kumbakonam of Thanjavur district, Tamil Nadu he now lives in Chennai. He completed B.A., (1980–83) in Government College, Kumbakonam. His books include articles and poems.

Books
 Compilation of poems - Oppanai Mukangal (Annam Publishers, Sivagangai, 1990
 Compilation of poems - Waiting (Annam Publishers, Sivagangai, 1995
 Letters of Vannadasan (Compilation of Kalyanji's letters) (Nanjappan Publishers, Coimbatore, 1997
 Compilation of poems - Kalathitha Idaiveliyil (Mathi Nilayam, Chennai, 2000
 Compilation of poems - Sembalil Aruntiya Nanju (Sandhya Publishers, Chennai, 2006
 Alumaigal and Tharunangal, Kalacchuvadu, Nagercoil, 2014
 Compilation of poems - Vithanathu Cithiram ( Bodhivanam Publishers, Chennai,  2017
 That was a different season, (Selected poetry of Ravisubramaniyan, English Translation R.Rajagopalan), Authors Press,
 Ninaivin Alizyil alayum kayalkal()

Documentaries
For TV channels he has made more than 100 documentaries. He also made the following documentaries on important Tamil scholars:
 Indira Parthasarathy (
 M.Renganathan (
 Jayakanthan (
 T. N. Ramachandran (
 Thiruloga Seetharam (
 He is selected by Kavidalaya for making documentary on K. Balachander, to be released on 9 July 2020, the 90th birthday of the veteran Indian filmmaker.
 Thamarai (

Articles
Some of his articles on Tamil scholars include the following:
 Dhenuga ( தேனுகா கட்டுரை
 M.V.Venkatraman (எம். வி. வி கட்டுரை
 Karicchankunju (கரிச்சான்குஞ்சு கட்டுரை
 S. V. Sahasranamam (சகஸ்ரநாமம் கட்டுரை

References

External links
 ஆவணப்படங்களுக்கு ஆதரவு இல்லை, ரவிசுப்பிரமணியன் நேர்காணல், தி இந்து, 23.11.2014
 காட்சியோடு இயைந்த கானம், தி இந்து, 18.12.2014
 மந்திரக் கோடுகளாலான ஓவியங்கள், தி இந்து, 27 டிசம்பர் 2015
 சங்கப் பாணர்களின் நீட்சியான கவிஞர், தி இந்து, 8 பிப்ரவரி 2016

Living people
Year of birth missing (living people)
People from Thanjavur district
Tamil poets